Hamburg German, also known as Hamburg dialect or Hamburger dialect (natively), is a group of Northern Low Saxon varieties spoken in Hamburg, Germany. Occasionally, the term Hamburgisch is also used for Hamburg Missingsch, a variety of standard German with Low Saxon substrates. These are urban dialects that have absorbed numerous English and Dutch loanwords, for instance Törn 'trip' (< turn) and suutje 'gently' (< Dutch ). This is also the dialect Standard German (Hochdeutsch) is based on.

Hamburg's name is pronounced  in these dialects, with a "ch" similar to that in the standard German words ich or Milch. Typical of the Hamburg dialects and other Lower Elbe dialects is the  pronunciation (and eu spelling) for the diphthong  (written öö, öh or ö), e.g.:

However, as in most other Low Saxon (Low German) dialects, the long monophthong  is pronounced  (as in French peu), for instance Kööm ~ Kœm  'caraway'.

The Low Saxon language in Hamburg is divided in several subdialects, namely:
Finkwarder Platt
Olwarder Platt
Veerlanner Platt (with many sub-sub-dialects)
Barmbeker Platt.

The Hamborger Veermaster is a famous sea shanty sung in the regional dialect.

Sources

External links
http://www.plattmaster.de

Culture in Hamburg
Northern Low Saxon dialects
German dialects
Languages of Germany
City colloquials